The Pocari Sweat Open was a professional golf tournament that was held at  Hakuryuko Country Club in Mihara, Hiroshima, Japan from 1979 to 1994. It was an event on the Japan Golf Tour from 1982.

Winners

Notes

References

External links
Coverage on Japan Golf Tour's official site

Former Japan Golf Tour events
Defunct golf tournaments in Japan
Sport in Hiroshima Prefecture
Otsuka Pharmaceutical
Recurring sporting events established in 1979
Recurring sporting events disestablished in 1994